Lincoln Jean-Marie is a British singer, born in London, England.

Jean-Marie has over fifteen years of working experience as a singer, songwriter, and arranger of both lead and backing vocals. He was also a member of the four-piece a cappella group Peace by Piece who were signed to Warner Bros. Records, released two UK singles and won Best Newcomers at the MOBO Awards. Lincoln Jean-Marie is the father of songwriter/producer Tre Jean-Marie.

Television, stage and tour work
London 2012 Olympics – sang as part of George Michael's band at the closing ceremony
Queen's Jubilee 2012 – sang backing vocals as part of the house band on stage
George Michael – backing singer as part of the band, touring the UK, Europe and the U.S.
Craig David – backing singer as part of the band, touring the UK, Europe and the US
Pet Shop Boys – sang backing vocals for the Pet Shop Boys on BBC 1's Top of the Pops
The Fresh Prince of Bel-Air – sang with a cappella group for studio audience
Radio 1 Roadshow (Ireland) – sang lead vocals
Lemar – backing singer as part of the band, touring the UK and Europe
Robbie Williams – backing singer as part of the band at German launch of World Tour

References

1976 births
21st-century Black British male singers
Singers from London
Living people